Rocky Ford is an unincorporated community in Franklin County, North Carolina,United States.  
It is located at an elevation of 397 feet or 121 m, it is west-northwest of the neighboring unincorporated community of Ingleside.

Jones-Wright House was listed on the National Register of Historic Places in 1992.

References

Unincorporated communities in Franklin County, North Carolina
Unincorporated communities in North Carolina